This is a list of Art Deco buildings and structures in Tulsa, Oklahoma.

Zigzag Style

PWA Style

Streamline Style

Deco Moderne Style

Art Deco Revival

Notes

References

Tulsa Art Deco Society
https://web.archive.org/web/20080119100734/http://tulsaartdecosociety.com/index.html%E2%80%94a great site with photos and more
Tulsa Foundation for Architecture, Art Deco Page

 List of Art Deco
Tulsa
Art Deco buildings in Tulsa